Kurumbathur village is located in Tirur Taluk of Malappuram district in Kerala, India. According to Census 2011 information. It is situated sub-district headquarter Tirur (tehsildar office) and 30km away from district headquarter Malappuram. As per 2009 stats, Athavanad is the gram panchayat of Kurumbathur village.
The total geographical area of village is 1333 hectares. Kurumbathur has a total population of 20,707 peoples, out of which male population is 9,686 while female population is 11,021. Literacy rate of kurumbathur village is 90.57% out of which 90.44% males and 91.68% females are literate. When it comes to administration, Kurumbathur village is administrated by a sarpanch who is elected representative of the village by the local elections. As per 2019 stats, Kurumbathur village comes under Tirur Assembly constituency & Ponnani Lok Sabha constituency.

The Kurumbathur name  is came from the word Kuru which means small, since the land has many small path ways, it is situated in between Pakkathu mana and Edassery kavu temple,

Transportation
Kurumbathur village connects National highway No.66 passes through Puthanathani and the northern stretch connects to Goa and Mumbai.  The southern stretch connects to Cochin and Trivandrum.  State Highway No.28 starts from Nilambur and connects to Ooty, Mysore and Bangalore through Highways.12,29 and 181. National Highway No.966 connects to Palakkad and Coimbatore.  The nearest airport is at Kozhikode.  The nearest major railway station is at Tirur.

References

   Villages in Malappuram district
Kottakkal area